Jiang Bin (born 1966/1967) is a Chinese billionaire entrepreneur, who co-founded acoustic components company GoerTek with his wife Hu Shuangmei. He is the chairman of GoerTek.

Early life
Jiang earned a bachelor's degree from Beijing University of Aeronautics and Astronautics, followed by an MBA from Tsinghua University.

Career
Jiang is the chairman of GoerTek.

GoerTek is listed on the Shenzhen Stock Exchange, and its customers include Samsung, Sony and Lenovo. His brother, Jiang Long, is vice chairman.

Personal life
Jiang is married to Hu Shuangmei. They live in Weifang, China, and have one child.

References

Living people
Chinese billionaires
People from Weifang
Tsinghua University alumni
Beihang University alumni
1960s births
Chinese company founders
20th-century Chinese businesspeople
21st-century Chinese businesspeople